12564 Ikeller, provisional designation , is a stony Koronian asteroid from the outer region of the asteroid belt, approximately 5 kilometers in diameter.

The asteroid was discovered by German amateur astronomer Wolf Bickel at his private Bergisch Gladbach Observatory on 22 September 1998. It was named after the discoverer's wife, Ingeborg Bickel–Keller.

Orbit and classification 

Ikeller is a member of the Koronis family, a group of stony asteroids in the outer main-belt named after 158 Koronis. It orbits the Sun at a distance of 2.7–2.9 AU once every 4 years and 9 months (1,743 days). Its orbit has an eccentricity of 0.04 and an inclination of 2° with respect to the ecliptic.

Physical characteristics 

According to the survey carried out by the NEOWISE mission of NASA's space-based Wide-field Infrared Survey Explorer, Ikeller measures 5.4 kilometers in diameter and its surface has an albedo of 0.22, while the Collaborative Asteroid Lightcurve Link assumes a standard albedo for Koronian asteroids of 0.24 and thus calculates a smaller diameter of 5.2 kilometers, as the higher the albedo (reflectivity), the smaller a body's diameter at a certain absolute magnitude (brightness).

Lightcurve 

In August 2077, a photometric lightcurve of Ikeller was obtained from photometric observations by astronomers at the Palomar Transient Factory in California. Lightcurve analysis gave a rotation period of  hours with a brightness variation of 0.44 magnitude.

Naming 

This minor planet was named by the discoverer after his wife, Ingeborg Bickel–Keller (born 1641). The approved naming citation was published by the Minor Planet Center on 16 January 2021.

References

External links 
 Koronis Family Asteroids Rotation Lightcurve Observing Program, Stephen M. Slivan, 2013
 Asteroid Lightcurve Database (LCDB), query form (info )
 Dictionary of Minor Planet Names, Google books
 Asteroids and comets rotation curves, CdR – Observatoire de Genève, Raoul Behrend
 Discovery Circumstances: Numbered Minor Planets (10001)-(15000) – Minor Planet Center
 
 

012564
Discoveries by Wolf Bickel
Named minor planets
19980922